The Santa Rosa hitchhiker murders were a series of at least seven unsolved homicides involving female hitchhikers that took place in Sonoma County and Santa Rosa of the North Bay area of California in 1972 and 1973. All of the victims were found nude in rural areas near steep embankments or in creek beds near roads.

Victims

Maureen Sterling and Yvonne Weber 

Maureen Louise Sterling, 12, and Yvonne Lisa Weber, 13, both Herbert Slater Middle School students, disappeared around 9 p.m. on February 4, 1972, after visiting the Redwood Empire Ice Arena. Both girls, like other young people in that era, often hitchhiked. They were last seen hitchhiking on Guerneville Road, northwest of Santa Rosa. An acquaintance who had spoken with them earlier that evening recalled in 2019 that Sterling and Weber had told her that a tall, slender man in his late-teens or early-twenties with black hair had asked them to smoke marijuana. The friend declined to accompany the girls to smoke with the man, whom she had never seen before. The witness told interviewers that, in retrospect, she thought the man she saw in the lobby at the ice arena resembled photographs of notorious serial killer Ted Bundy. The girls, whom the friend described as dressed in such a way that they were able to pass for several years older than they actually were, disappeared a short time later. Other reports at the time indicated that the two girls might have been looking for a ride to meet someone at a bowling alley. There were rumors that the girls might have previously been in contact with a man who lived along the Russian River, but police could not confirm that connection either.  Their parents told police that, at the time they disappeared, the 5 feet 5 inch tall, 117 pound, blue-eyed brunette Sterling was wearing blue denim pants with a purple pullover shirt, a red sweatshirt with 
a hood and zipper, and brown suede shoes. Weber, described as blonde and blue-eyed, 5 feet, 2 inches tall and weighing 105 pounds, was wearing blue denim pants, a lavender and white tweed pullover shirt, a black velvet coat, and brown suede boots.
Classmates of the girls were questioned about their whereabouts at school the following 
week, but none of the leads police received proved fruitful. Police had believed the girls were runaways.

A single earring, orange beads and a 14-carat gold necklace with cross were found at the scene. The cause of death could not be determined from the skeletal remains. Sterling’s mother identified the cross necklace and earring as her daughter’s property. The mate to the earring was not found at the scene. Binding materials were found in the brush at the site that suggested the two girls had been restrained by their killer or killers. No clothing or other items belonging to the girls were found.

Kim Wendy Allen 

Santa Rosa Junior College art student Kim Wendy Allen, 19, was also a frequent hitchhiker despite hearing warnings from her mother and one of her college professors about the danger of rape and/or murder for young female hitchhikers. Allen, like many other young women during that era, did not believe she was at risk. She was given a ride by two men on March 4, 1972, from her job at Larkspur Natural Foods to San Rafael. They last saw her at approximately 5:20 p.m. hitchhiking to school near the Bell Avenue entrance to Highway 101, northbound, carrying a large wooden soy barrel with red Chinese characters on it. The victim had been bound at the ankles and wrists, raped and slowly strangled with a cord for an estimated thirty minutes. Semen was recovered from the body and a single gold loop earring was found at the site. Markings at the top of the embankment and a possible leg impression in the loam indicated the assailant likely slipped or fell while throwing or transporting the body. The two men who gave her a ride, one of whom was given and passed a polygraph test, were ruled out as suspects. Her checkbook was deposited in a drive-up mailbox across from the Kentfield, California Post Office sometime on the morning of March 24, 1972, 20 days after she was murdered. Police thought two fingerprints on the checkbook might belong to the killer. When she was found, Allen also had an oily substance on her right side that authorities said was similar to the oil used in a machine shop.

Lori Lee Kursa 
Lori Lee Kursa, 13, a Lawrence Cook Middle School student, had been reported missing by her mother on November 11, 1972 after disappearing while they shopped at a U-Save and was last seen on November 20 or 21 in Santa Rosa while visiting friends, having deliberately run away. Someone reported possibly seeing  Kursa hitchhiking on November 30. Her home life was troubled and she was a frequent hitchhiker and habitual runaway. The killer had thrown the body at least  over an embankment. The girl had a single wire loop in each earlobe, but the rest of the earrings were missing and were not found at the scene.

The cause of her death was a broken neck with compression and hemorrhage of the spinal cord. The victim had not been raped and likely died one to two weeks prior to discovery. Two people later called in tips to the police about possible sightings of Kursa. One tipster reported seeing two men with a girl on Calistoga Road. A second caller reported seeing a girl with a Caucasian man who had “bushy” hair in a pickup truck that had been parked near the site where Kursa was later found deceased. Neither caller was able to provide further details. A possible witness to her abduction later came forward stating that on an evening somewhere between December 3 and 9, 1972, while on Parkhurst Drive, he saw two men walking with a young girl. The girl, who fit Kursa’s description, appeared to be physically impaired in some manner, as the two men were supporting her between them. The witness saw the men run across the road with the girl and push her into the back of a van that had been parked on the side of the roadway. The driver was a Caucasian man with an Afro-type hairstyle. The vehicle then sped north on Calistoga Road.

Authorities speculated that Kursa was kidnapped, forced into the van, stripped of her clothing, and that she opened the passenger door of the speeding vehicle in an attempt to escape her captor or captors, fell or jumped or was pushed out and broke her neck in the fall into the ravine. Her captor or captors left her by the side of the road. The broken neck would have prevented Kursa from moving, but it would have taken some time for her to die from the injury.

Carolyn Davis 
Carolyn Nadine Davis, 15, ran away from her home outside Anderson in Shasta County on February 6, 1973 and by some accounts spent the next five months traveling. She had left her mother a note that said: “Dear Mom. Don’t worry too much about me, the only thing I'm gonna be doing is keeping myself alive. Love, Carolyn.” She posted a letter to her mother and stepfather shortly after she ran away in which she wrote that she had left voluntarily and never planned to return home. Her older sister told an interviewer in 2022 that Davis actually stayed with her in her duplex apartment in Garberville, California after she ran away. Davis  was afraid her mother would make her go home so she asked friends who were hitchhiking south to send letters to her mother that were postmarked in different towns. Davis told her sister she had witnessed a double murder in Shasta County and that she was afraid for her life. While her sister was skeptical of the story at first, Davis was so fearful that she insisted on sleeping on the floor of a closet in the bedroom her sister shared with her boyfriend, perhaps because her sister’s boyfriend had guns. Her older sister urged Davis to let their mother know where she was, but Davis refused and the sister did not reveal her whereabouts to their mother. Her sister described Davis as mature and a “good girl” who had “gotten lost” and who had been allowed to “run wild.” 

Eventually Davis, increasingly paranoid that she might be found by someone connected with the murders, left her sister’s apartment and hitchhiked to Illinois. She returned to Garberville in the summer of 1973 because her sister was about to give birth. Davis stayed with her grandmother, who lived in the same neighborhood in Garberville as her older sister, for about two weeks in early July 1973 before she decided to leave again to visit her boyfriend in Illinois, according to her sister. Davis usually called her sister every two or three days when she was on the road to let her know where she was, but her sister never heard from Davis again after she left Garberville on July 15, 1973.

According to other accounts, Davis told her grandmother that she planned to hitchhike to Modesto, California and stay there with friends. Her grandmother drove the 15-year-old girl to the downtown district of Garberville on July 15, 1973, and parked in front of the post office, which was located two city blocks away from Highway 101. Davis was last seen hitchhiking that afternoon near the Highway 101 ramp, southbound, in Garberville. Her body was discovered on July 31, 1973 in Santa Rosa, just  from where the remains of Sterling and Weber had been recovered seven months prior. The cause of her death was strychnine poisoning 10 to 14 days before discovery. It could not be determined whether the poison had been administered to Davis by needle or by pill. Strychnine was sometimes mixed with other drugs, but an autopsy showed no trace of either heroin or amphetamines in her system. 

A pathologist determined her probable date of death was July 20, 1973, five days after her grandmother had last seen her. It could not be determined if she had been raped. An autopsy found that Davis had an injury to her right earlobe that appeared to be an attempted ear piercing. Her left earlobe had not been pierced. Investigators postulated that her 5 feet 7 inch, 100 pound body had been thrown from the road by her killer or killers as the hillside brush appeared undisturbed.  An investigator said a witchcraft symbol meaning "carrier of spirits" was found by her body. Police reported in 1975 that it was “a rectangle connected to a square, with bars running along side” constructed of twigs or sticks. It was identified as an occult symbol dating back to medieval England and suggested a possible connection to the Zodiac Killer. The symbol was located on the roadway above the site where Davis was found. Other investigators later cast doubt on the meaning of the twig figure and whether it had any connection to the girl’s murder.

Sometime after Davis was found murdered, when the sister was working as a hotel maid at the California Motel in Anderson, the sister found a map in a room she was cleaning that had belonged to Davis and had been in her possession when she left Garberville on July 15, 1973. The map had been written on by both Davis and her older sister. The sister gave the map to local police and also spoke with investigators in both Shasta and Sonoma Counties. The sister still wonders whether Davis’s murder had something to do with the murders the girl said she had witnessed or if it was unrelated.

Theresa Walsh 
Theresa Diane Smith Walsh, 23, who was nicknamed “Terri”,  left her home in Miranda, in the winter of 1973 to spend time away from her husband and young son. She hitchhiked her way across California, often catching rides along Highway 101. She had never before had any difficulties or thought she was in danger while hitchhiking. In late December of 1973, she was in Malibu, California but wanted to go home for Christmas to see her mother and son. She was last seen on December 22, 1973, at Zuma Beach in Malibu, intent on hitchhiking to Garberville.  Her partially submerged body was found six days later by kayakers in Mark West Creek.  She had been hogtied with clothesline rope, sexually assaulted, and strangled, and was determined to have been dead approximately one week. High water marks contemporaneous with heavy rains in the area suggested the body could have drifted several miles.

Jane Doe 
Due to the age of the remains, authorities initially believed them to be those of Jeannette Kamahele until a comparison of dental records later proved negative. The victim had been hogtied and her arm fractured around the time of her murder, and her corpse had been stuffed into a laundry or duffel bag before being dumped in the ravine, but there was no other evidence to establish a cause of death. 

Her weight and eye color could not be ascertained, and no clothing was found. One expert consulted by authorities determined that the victim was likely killed between 1972 and 1974 and was about 19-years-old. Hard contact lenses were not often sold in the United States and Canada after the mid-1970s, when soft contact lenses became available. She had also been bound in the same manner as Walsh.

Possible victims

Lisa Michele Smith 
Lisa Michele Smith, 17, was last seen hitchhiking on Hearn Avenue in Santa Rosa, Sonoma County, California and her disappearance was never solved. She was initially reported missing from Petaluma, California, by her foster parents on March 16, 1971 after she was last seen hitchhiking a short distance away from her foster home, along Hearn Avenue, at around 7 p.m. At the time, she was wearing a white blouse with ruffles, a dark pea coat, green bell-bottom jeans, and cowboy boots.

A young woman named "Lisa Smith", which is a common name, was hitchhiking on March 26, 1971 and was picked up by a male driver. He reportedly brandished a gun and threatened to rape her. She jumped out of the pickup, which was going about 55 miles per hour south of Novato, California. She was treated at Novato General Hospital for a skull fracture and multiple, severe cuts and bruises. A nurse at the hospital thought she looked about 21-years-old. An article published on April 1, 1971 in the Santa Rosa Press Democrat reported that the "Lisa Smith" treated at Novato General Hospital was the same person as the missing 17-year-old Lisa Michele Smith. The individual believed to have been Smith left the hospital before authorities could interview her and purportedly hitchhiked back to San Francisco. Her biological parents then located her shortly afterwards and took her back to their home in Livermore, California, according to the article, which quoted a juvenile officer from the sheriff’s office. 

However, the Press Democrat reported in 2011 that the missing 17-year-old Smith was not actually found. It is still not certain whether the two Lisa Smiths actually were the same woman or whether they were two separate people. All of the hospital and law enforcement records related to the case were missing by 2011 and authorities hoped to find Lisa Michele Smith or someone who had known her to determine what happened. Authorities suspect it is possible that she was a homicide victim or that her case could have been related to the other attacks in the area during the same time period.

Jeannette Kamahele 
Jeannette Kamahele, a 20-year-old Santa Rosa Junior College student, was last seen on April 25, 1972, hitchhiking near the Cotati on-ramp of Highway 101. A friend witnessed her likely abduction and reported that she entered a faded brown Chevrolet pickup truck fitted with a homemade wooden camper and driven by a 20- to 30-year-old Caucasian male with an Afro hairstyle. Her body has never been found.

Kerry Ann Graham and Francine Marie Trimble 
Kerry Ann Graham, 15, and Francine Marie Trimble, 14, of Forestville, disappeared in mid-December 1978. Skeletal remains were found the following July in Mendocino County where they were dumped off the side of a rural highway, but they were not identified as belonging to Graham and Trimble until 2015 thanks to DNA analysis. A high school friend said she last saw the girls on a morning in December when all of them were smoking outside the high school. Graham and Trimble, who had been associating with classmates who used drugs, had gone to school that day but did not attend classes. The girls told their friend that they were going to hitchhike to a party in Santa Rosa but did not say who they were meeting. The friend said someone else they knew had seen the girls hitchhiking at a Chevron gas station in Forestville. It was not clear whether this occurred on the day the girls went missing. 

Trimble had also told her mother she intended to do some Christmas shopping at Coddingtown Mall in Santa Rosa. Trimble’s mother had seen the girls at her home sometime on December 15, 1978 and Graham’s sister recalled seeing them at her parents’ home either on December 15 or 16, 1978. The girls also mentioned to Graham’s sister that they planned to go to a party, but she did not recall further details. Graham was recovering from surgery to remove her appendix but had left the antibiotics she was still taking behind at her home.

Trimble’s mother reported her missing to police within a few days when she had not returned home. Graham had a habit of running away to stay with friends, as had her older siblings, and her parents were not overly concerned at first when she did not come home. They did not tell her brother that Graham was missing until they saw him in person years later. Police also did not question any of the girls’ classmates and many were not aware they were considered missing. No official missing person report was filed for Graham until decades later, when Graham’s sister suspected the victims found were Graham and Trimble and urged police to conduct DNA testing. Police had believed the girls were runaways and had not thoroughly investigated their disappearance.

Authorities could not identify a cause of death for the victims who were found in 1979 but duct tape was found at the scene, likely indicating the two girls had been bound. A single bird-shaped earring was found at the scene that Graham’s sister later identified as one she had given to Graham. A mate to the earring was not found at the scene. No clothing or other items belonging to Graham or Trimble were found at the scene.

FBI report on additional victims (1975)
In 1975, the Federal Bureau of Investigation issued a report stating that fourteen unsolved homicides between 1972 and 1974 were committed by the same perpetrator. These consist of the six found victims as of 1975 and the following:
 Rosa Vasquez, 20, last seen May 26; her body was found on May 29, 1973.  near the Arguello boulevard entrance at Golden Gate Park in San Francisco. Vasquez had been a keypunch operator at Letterman General Hospital on the Presidio. 
 Yvonne Quilantang, 15, was found strangled in a vacant Bayview district lot on June 10, 1973. She was seven months pregnant and had been out to buy groceries.
 Angela Thomas, 16, a resident of Belton, Texas, was found July 2, 1973, smothered on the playground of Benjamin Franklin Junior High School in Daly City. She had last been seen the previous evening at the Presidio of San Francisco walking away from the area at 9:00 p.m. A locket was recovered near the body.
 Nancy Patricia Gidley, a 24-year-old radiographer last seen at a Rodeway Inn motel on July 12, 1973, was found strangled behind the George Washington High School gymnasium three days later. The victim was unclothed except for a single fish-shaped gold earring and was determined to have died within the previous 24 hours. Gidley had served four years in the Air Force and told friends and family in Mountain Home, Idaho that she intended to become a freelance writer for the San Francisco Chronicle and was going to San Francisco to be the maid of honour at the wedding of a friend from Hamilton Air Force Base, all of which proved false.
 Nancy Feusi, 22, disappeared after going dancing at a club in the Sacramento area. Her remains were found on July 22, 1973, in Redding. She had been stabbed to death. In 2011, one of Feusi's five children, Angela Darlene Feusi McAnulty, was convicted of torturing, beating, and starving to death her 15-year-old daughter Jeanette Marie Maples. McAnulty became the second woman ever sentenced to die in Oregon and the first since the 1984 reinstatement of the death penalty.
 Laura Albright  O'Dell, 21, missing since November 4, 1973, was found three days later in bushes behind the boathouse at Stow Lake in Golden Gate Park. O'Dell's hands were tied behind her back, and the cause of death appeared to be from head injuries or strangulation.
 Brenda Kaye Merchant, 19, was found stabbed to death at her home on February 1, 1974, in Marysville. She had been stabbed over 30 times with a long bladed knife and had asphyxiated on her own blood from her many wounds. She was wearing a nightgown when she was discovered in her living room. The killer left a bloody handprint on the screen door of the apartment and it is believed that Merchant was attacked between when she was last seen at 6 p.m. to when a loud argument was heard by neighbors at around midnight.
 Donna Maria Braun, 14, whose strangled body was found at 7 p.m. on September 29, 1974 in the Salinas River near Monterey by a crop dusting pilot who was flying overhead. She was an Alisal High School freshman who lived with and was eventually identified by her mother and was last seen at 6.pm. on September 27, leaving her Salinas home.

Suspects

The Zodiac Killer 

The unapprehended Zodiac Killer is a suspect, due to similarities between an unknown symbol on his January 29, 1974 "Exorcist letter" to the San Francisco Chronicle, in which he claims 37 victims, and the Chinese characters on the missing soy barrel carried by Kim Allen, as well as stating an intention to vary his modus operandi in an earlier November 9, 1969 letter to the San Francisco Chronicle: "I shall no longer announce to anyone. when I comitt my murders, they shall look like routine robberies, killings of anger, + a few fake accidents, etc." (sic)

Arthur Leigh Allen 
Arthur Leigh Allen, of Vallejo, owned a mobile home at Sunset Trailer Park in Santa Rosa at the time of the murders. He had been fired from his Valley Springs Elementary School teaching position for suspected child molestation in 1968 and was a full-time student at Sonoma State University. Allen was arrested on September 27, 1974, by the Sonoma County Sheriff's Office and charged with child molestation in an unrelated case involving a young boy. He pleaded guilty on March 14, 1975, and was imprisoned at Atascadero State Hospital until late 1977.

Robert Graysmith, in his book Zodiac Unmasked, claimed that a Sonoma County sheriff revealed that chipmunk hairs were found on all of the Santa Rosa Hitchhiker victims and that Allen had been collecting and studying the same species. Allen was the main suspect in the Zodiac case from 1971 until the present.

Ted Bundy 
After his capture for similar crimes in Washington, Colorado, Utah and Idaho, Ted Bundy was suspected in the murders. Bundy had spent time in neighboring Marin County, but was ruled out by a Sonoma County detective in the 1970s and again in 1989. Detailed credit card records and known whereabouts of Bundy reveal he was in Washington on the dates of some of the disappearances. A 2011 San Francisco Chronicle article noted that the dates of the credit card receipts show there would have been enough time for Bundy to drive to California, commit the crimes, and then drive back to Washington. Bundy was known to drive hundreds of miles to commit a murder. Some investigators also rule Bundy out as a suspect because they think the killer probably lived in the Santa Rosa area and only a local man, perhaps someone who worked as a mail carrier or a public utility worker, would have been familiar with the remote, rural locations where the victims were recovered.  A 1973 newspaper article noted that, at the time the victims were recovered, several hundred young people in the area were living nearby in communes.

Fredric Manalli 
Fredric Manalli, a 41-year-old Santa Rosa Junior College creative writing instructor, was suspected when, after his August 24, 1976 death in a head-on collision on Highway 12, sadomasochistic drawings he had created depicting a former student, Kim Wendy Allen, who was one of the victims, were discovered among his belongings.

The Hillside Stranglers of Los Angeles
Kenneth Bianchi and Angelo Buono, Jr., the Hillside Stranglers of Los Angeles, were also considered suspects at one time.

Jack Bokin
Jack Alexander Bokin, a violent, serial rapist who died in prison in December 2021 at age 78, has been suggested as another possible suspect by law enforcement. DNA testing linked him in 2022 to the 1996 unsolved murder of a woman in California’s wine country.

See also 

 Murders of Kerry Graham and Francine Trimble
 

General:
 List of fugitives from justice who disappeared
 List of serial killers in the United States

References

External links 
 September 1975 Front Page Detective magazine
 

1972 in California
1972 murders in the United States
1973 in California
1973 murders in the United States
1974 in California
1974 murders in the United States
American murder victims
American murderers of children
American rapists
Deaths by strangulation in the United States
Fugitives
History of Santa Rosa, California
History of women in California
Hitchhiking
Murder in California
Murder in the San Francisco Bay Area
Murdered American children
People murdered in California
Serial murders in the United States
Unidentified American serial killers
Unsolved murders in the United States